William Field (born 1952) is an Irish former Gaelic footballer. At club level he played with St Michael's and at inter-county level was a member of the Cork senior football team.

Career

Field enjoyed his first successes, not as a Gaelic footballer but as a hurling goalkeeper with the Blackrock minor team that won Cork MHC titles in 1968 and 1969. He also played as a schoolboy with Coláiste Chríost Rí and was part of the school team that won a Corn Uí Mhuirí-Hogan Cup double in 1970. He was later a member of the University College Cork team that beat University College Galway to win the Sigerson Cup title in 1972. Field first appeared on the inter-county scene as a member of the Cork minor football team in 1970. He later appeared with the under-21 team after making his senior team debut in December 1972. Field was Cork's top scorer in his debut season and also won a Munster SFC, however, he suffered a broken leg which ruled him out of Cork's 1973 All-Ireland final defeat of Galway. He returned to the team over team over the following few seasons. Field was also a member of the St. Michael's team that lost three consecutive Cork SFC finals from 1976 to 1978.

Honours

Coláiste Chríost Rí
Hogan Cup: 1970
Corn Uí Mhuirí: 1970

University College Cork
Sigerson Cup: 1972

Blackrock
Cork Minor Hurling Championship: 1968, 1969

Cork
Munster Senior Football Championship: 1973

References

1952 births
Living people
St Michael's (Cork) Gaelic footballers
Blackrock National Hurling Club hurlers
Cork inter-county Gaelic footballers
Hurling goalkeepers